Isaac Sharp (1681–1735) was an early New Jersey settler, politician, judge and Colonel of the militia.

Early life and family

Born January 13, 1681, in Dublin, Ireland, Isaac Sharp was the eldest surviving son of Quaker Anthony Sharp and Ann Crabb. As part of the Quaker settlement of his father's extensive land holdings in New Jersey, Isaac Sharp left Ireland in November 1700, and after an arduous eighteen-week journey, arrived in Colonial America on April 6, 1701.

Isaac settled in Salem County, New Jersey and named the area Blessingtown after Blessington in County Wicklow, near the border of Kildare, on the road travelled by the Sharps from Roundwood, Queen's County, to and from Dublin.  The town was subsequently renamed Sharpstown after the Sharp family settlers.

Isaac Sharp married Margaret Braithwaite of Salem County in 1704, and had children: Anthony (who inherited the Queen's County, Ireland property), Isaac (also a Judge of Salem County Court, appointed by King George II in 1741), Joseph, Mary, Sarah and Rachel (mother of Colonel Sharp Delany).  Isaac's son Joseph Sharp was the grandfather of Moses Austin and the great-grandfather of Stephen F. Austin and Emily Austin Perry.

Career

In addition to being a member of the Council of Proprietors, Isaac Sharp served as judge of the Salem County Court (1709–1717) and was a member of the New Jersey General Assembly from 1709 to 1721.

Isaac Sharp was also a Colonel of the militia of West New Jersey for Salem and Cape May.

Later life

Upon his father's death in 1707, Sharp inherited all of Anthony Sharp's land in West New Jersey, and half of his lands in East New Jersey, as well as his land in Queen's County, Ireland, including land in Killinure, which became the site of the Sharp Roundwood Estate.  Isaac returned to Ireland in about 1726 and resided on his Queen's County property until his death in 1735.

References

Bibliography

External links
Roundwood House 
Brief History of the Roundwood House

1681 births
1735 deaths
Irish Quakers
17th-century Quakers
18th-century Quakers
17th-century Irish people
Kingdom of Ireland emigrants to the Thirteen Colonies